Beyond and Back: The X Anthology is a two-disc compilation album by American rock band X, released October 28, 1997 by Elektra Records. The anthology's tracks are split between already-released songs and demos, single versions, outtakes and live recordings.

Track listing

Personnel
X
John Doe – bass, acoustic guitar, vocals
Exene Cervenka – vocals
Billy Zoom – guitar
D.J. Bonebrake – drums
Additional personnel
Ray Manzarek – organ
Tony Gilkyson – guitar

X (American band) compilation albums
1997 compilation albums
Elektra Records compilation albums